Abaseen or Abasin Division is a proposed division in Pakistan's Khyber Pakhtunkhwa province, which will comprise seven districts: Battagram, Allai, Kolai-Palas, Upper Kohistan, Lower Kohistan, Shangla, and Torghar. The area is located on both sides of the Indus River, which is known in Pashto and other local languages as Abaseen.

It is declared that either Battagram, the capital of Battagram District, or Besham, a town at the eastern end of Shangla District, will become the headquarters of Abaseen Division.

History
On 18 June 2011, Abaseen Division was announced by then Chief Minister of Khyber Pakhtunkhwa, Haider Khan Hoti during his speech at a public gathering in Battagram, but it was not approved because of the census. In December 2022, Abaseen Division was approved by Chief Minister Mahmood Khan.

References

Divisions of Khyber Pakhtunkhwa